Phytomyza affinis is a species of fly in the family Agromyzidae. It is found in the Palearctic. Description of imago-Antennomere  III brown black, 1-11 red. Mesonotum matt black lateral parts and notopleural depression yellow. Acrosticals in 2-4 rows. Coxae 1 yellow basally, II-III blackish. Femora yellow (black basally). Base of femora, tibiae and tarsi black. Abdomen brown black. Tergites with a yellow apical line dilated at the sides. Long. : 2,5–3 mm.  The larva mines Cirsium arvense and also feeds on seeds of Euphrasia.

References

External links
Images representing  Phytomyza  at BOLD
Leaf miners

Agromyzidae
Insects described in 1823
Diptera of Europe